The 2007 CONCACAF Gold Cup Final was a soccer match that took place on June 24, 2007, at Soldier Field in Chicago, Illinois, United States, to determine the winner of the 2007 CONCACAF Gold Cup. The United States beat longtime rivals Mexico 2–1 to win the tournament.

Route to the final

Match

References

External links
 Official website 

2007 CONCACAF Gold Cup
CONCACAF Gold Cup finals
CONCACAF Gold Cup Final
CONCACAF Gold Cup Final
United States men's national soccer team matches
Mexico national football team matches
Mexico–United States soccer rivalry
Sports competitions in Chicago
Soccer in Chicago
CONCACAF Gold Cup Final
CONCACAF Gold Cup Final
2000s in Chicago